Mamadou N'Doye (born October 6, 1979) is a Senegalese former basketball player. He played for the Senegalese national team, where he participated at the 2014 FIBA Basketball World Cup.

N'Doye played in the Senegalese Nationale 1 for UGB and won the league's MVP award in 2013.

References

External links
 Afrobasket.com profile
 RealGM profile

1979 births
Living people
People from Rufisque
Point guards
Shooting guards
Senegalese men's basketball players
2014 FIBA Basketball World Cup players